Tradera.com is an online marketplace based in Stockholm, Sweden. With its 3 million members, 6 million weekly visits and more than 4 million listings at any given point (2021), it's the largest marketplace in the Nordics for sustainable shopping. Items are sold from both private consumers and businesses and are ranging from fashion and interior design to tech and collectibles.  Although Tradera welcomes members from all over the world, most are from within the EU and Sweden. Tradera was originally based completely on auctions, but today visitors can purchase both new and second hand items through auctions as well as fixed price listings. Tradera was founded in 1999 but was acquired by eBay Inc. in 2006, which already owned the financial tech company PayPal. When eBay and PayPal were separated in 2015, Tradera became part of PayPal. Since PayPal's sale of Tradera in 2021, Tradera has once again become a Swedish company.

History 
Tradera was founded in 1999 with Daniel Kaplan as CEO. The objective was to create a service to decrease the distance between collectors in Europe who wanted to trade various types of exclusive jewelry. It was originally intended to be a small project but investors became interested and invested in the company, which led to rapidly increasing expansion plans. However, after about a year in a luxurious office at Norrmalmstorg in Stockholm the company ran out of money as a result of the IT bubble bursting.

In 2003, the company had regained its strong position and in 2004 it had about 400 000 members. In April 2006 the company was acquired by eBay Inc. for 365 million SEK, and in 2011 the member count was up to 2,5 million. When eBay and PayPal split in 2015, Tradera became a part of PayPal. Since PayPal's sale of Tradera in 2021, Tradera has once again become a Swedish company.

Items 
Millions of items are listed on Tradera, in categories such as collectibles, clothing, music, electronics and art. From having previously focused on private consumer-to-consumer auctions, the service now accommodates both private and commercial sellers. Swedish visitors are able to use the service. International buyers are permitted to use Tradera with a registered PayPal account. Although the service is commonly referred to as an online auction service, it is also possible to buy and sell items for fixed prices. The company has previously collaborated with various organisations, such as Röda korset, Wateraid, Musikhjälpen and Cancerfonden. In 2021 an initiative named "Donera med Tradera" was started in order to raise money for charities. Since 2017 members have collectively raised more than 35 million Swedish crowns to charities.

As opposed to the major competing service in the Swedish market, the majority of items sold are delivered to the buyer through postal or delivery services, and both freight and payment solutions are integrated in the platform.

References

External links 
 

eBay
PayPal
Online auction websites of Sweden
Companies based in Stockholm
Swedish companies established in 1999
Retail companies established in 1999
Internet properties established in 1999
2006 mergers and acquisitions
2015 mergers and acquisitions